Pavel Rafailovich Bermondt-Avalov or Pavel Avalishvili ( – 27 December 1973) was an Ussuri Cossack and warlord. He is best known as the commander of the West Russian Volunteer Army which was active in present-day Latvia and Lithuania in the aftermath of World War I.

Biography

Early life
Bermondt-Avalov was born at Tbilisi in modern Georgia. He adopted his second surname Avalov (Avalishvili) after his adoptive father, Georgian prince Mikhail Avalishvili. He received a musical education joining the Ussuri Cossacks in 1906 after serving as a musical conductor in the Transbaikal Cossacks. He joined a regiment of Lancers in 1909 and was promoted to captain in 1914.

Civil War
He was appointed to lead the German-established Western Russian army (subsequently frequently known after his name as "the Bermontians"), which was meant to go to fight the Bolsheviks (Communists) in the Russian Civil War; however, believing that the Bolsheviks would be defeated without his help, Pavel Bermondt-Avalov decided to strike against the newly independent nations of Lithuania and Latvia instead. His "Special Russians Corps" supposedly numbered about 50,000 men. He was one of the few anti-bolshevik generals who openly promoted monarchist ideals.

Bermondt-Avalov was promoted Major General in 1918. He took over the White Forces in the Latvia and Lithuania from Prince Anatoly Lieven, who commanded a contingent in the Baltische Landwehr. In 1919, his forces joined those of Major General Rüdiger von der Goltz to form the so-called "West Russian Volunteer Army" which attempted to proclaim the "Western Central Government" in Riga. German Free Corps were operating in Latvia since spring 1919 to keep away the Red Army. In the summer of 1919, the Entente Powers and the German government ordered the troops back, but the soldiers refused. Until the beginning of October 1919 most of the 40,000 German volunteers entered the Bermondt-Army consisting of about 10,000 Russians, mostly former prisoners of war released from German camps. With this masquerade the Germans tried to keep their engagement in the Baltics and to secure German interests in the area. They used Bermondt for their own purposes. Since the German government stopped paying for the troops, finances were coming mostly from German economic leaders that had interests in the Baltics. At the end the Army printed its own money.

The Western Russian army managed to capture Zemgale, Courland (except Liepāja), Samogitia and entered Riga, but later were defeated by the Latvian and Lithuanian armies, with the help of the Estonian forces. This Baltic diversion of Bermondt-Avalov heavily contributed to his already existing reputation as an "adventurer" (such as General Bulak-Balakovich) especially among Latvian historians.
Under pressure of the Baltic independent states then in formation, the Entente and the German government withdrew the Army. By mid-December 1919 the last Russo-German soldiers crossed the borders into Germany (Tilsit).

Post war
Pavel Bermondt-Avalov then emigrated to Western Europe, where he published a book of memoirs. He lived in Germany from 1921 and was involved in right wing and fascist movements. Strongly supportive of National Socialism, he established his own movement, the Russian National Social Movement. Despite this he was imprisoned by the Nazis in 1939 along with other Russian exiles and deported. He settled in Belgrade and later moved to the United States. He died in New York City in 1973.

Honours and awards
 Knight of the Order of Saint George IV class
 Order of St. Anna

Sources

References

1877 births
1974 deaths
Military personnel from Tbilisi
People from Tiflis Governorate
Cossacks from the Russian Empire
Memoirists from the Russian Empire
Nobility from the Russian Empire
Generals of the Russian Empire
Anti-communists from the Russian Empire
Russian people of World War I
White movement generals
Warlords
Recipients of the Order of St. Anna
German emigrants to Yugoslavia
Yugoslav emigrants to the United States